Bellotti v. Baird, 428 U.S. 132 (1976), was a United States Supreme Court case in which the Court upheld a Massachusetts law requiring parental consent to a minor's abortion, under the provision that "if one or both of the [minor]'s parents refuse... consent, consent may be obtained by order of a judge... for good cause shown." The decision was unanimous, and the opinion of the Court was written by Harry Blackmun. The law in question "permits a minor capable of giving informed consent to obtain a court order allowing abortion without parental consultation, and further permits even a minor incapable of giving informed consent to obtain an abortion order without parental consultation where it is shown that abortion would be in her best interests."

The case was initially titled  as Baird v. Quinn (Baird et al. v. Quinn et al.) since that proceedings commenced, Robert H. Quinn was the attorney general of Massachusetts. He was replaced in 1975 by Francis X. Bellotti.

See also 
 Bellotti v. Baird

References

External links 
 
 

United States Supreme Court cases
United States Supreme Court cases of the Burger Court
United States abortion case law
History of women's rights in the United States
History of women in Massachusetts
United States privacy case law
1976 in United States case law